Mark Rosenbloom  is  an American medical doctor, author, speaker, entrepreneur, and coach. He is the Founder and Chief Medical Officer of LIFEFORCE Medical Institute. He is also the Founder of The Unicorn Children’s Foundation, for children with development and communication disorders and Founder and CEO of PEPID, LLC, a point-of-care medical and drug reference software.

Education

Rosenbloom was trained at McGill University (where he received his BA with Honors Economics), Northwestern University Medical School (where he received his MD and achieved early AOA status after his sophomore year), Stanford University (where he received his MBA), and the Cenegenics Education and Research Foundation.

Career
Rosenbloom has practiced Emergency, Preventive, and Age Management Medicine since 1990. He is the CEO and Chief Medical Officer at LIFEFORCE Medical Institute. He began his training at Stanford University and attended Northwestern University Feinberg School of Medicine where he won the Dean's AOA Research Award and the Sigmund Winton Award in Biochemistry. He completed his residency in Emergency Medicine at University of Illinois Combined Emergency Medicine Program in 1993 and practiced emergency medicine at Northwestern Memorial Hospital for close to 2 decades, achieving the rank of Associate Professor of Clinical Medicine in the Department of Medicine at Northwestern University.

Rosenbloom trained at the Cenegenics Education and Research Foundation and founded LIFEFORCE Medical Institute which focuses his practice on anti-aging and optimal health and performance utilizing comprehensive diagnostics, genetic testing and Bio-Identical Hormone Replacement Therapy (BHRP).

Rosenbloom has also been the Editor of the nationally published Your Health Magazine and has been published in print and media on various topics such as age management, low testosterone for men, BHRT, nutrition, exercise,  medical errors, and vitamin toxicity. His teachings include seminars and network TV appearances on these topics in the Chicago metropolitan area.

Rosenbloom has publicly spoken multiple times regarding communication and learning disorders in children, including numerous network TV appearances in Miami, Boca Raton and Palm Beach, Florida.

Philanthropy
Rosenbloom founded the Unicorn Children's Foundation for children with communication and learning disorders and is a founding member of the Interdisciplinary Council on Developmental and Learning Disorders.

Awards
Rosenbloom won the Sigmund S. Winton award in Biochemistry.

References

American physicians
Living people
Year of birth missing (living people)